Takigawa Dam  is a gravity dam located in Mie Prefecture in Japan. The dam is used for flood control and water supply. The catchment area of the dam is 1.6 km2. The dam impounds about 4  ha of land when full and can store 282 thousand cubic meters of water. The construction of the dam was started on 1990 and completed in 1999.

See also
List of dams in Japan

References

Dams in Mie Prefecture